Two species of lizard are named ocellated tegu:
 Cercosaura bassleri
 Cercosaura ocellata